Miloš Kopečný (born 26 December 1993) is a Czech footballer who plays for Senica in the Fortuna Liga as a defender.

Club career

FK Senica
Kopečný made his Fortuna Liga debut for Senica against DAC Dunajská Streda on 20 September 2020. He appeared in the starting-XI and played the entirety of the 2:4 defeat.

References

External links
 FK Senica official club profile 
 Futbalnet profile 
 
 

1993 births
Living people
People from Holešov
Czech footballers
Czech expatriate footballers
Association football forwards
SK Hanácká Slavia Kroměříž players
FC Fastav Zlín players
SK Spartak Hulín players
FK Baník Sokolov players
FC Hradec Králové players
SK Dynamo České Budějovice players
FK Senica players
Czech National Football League players
Czech First League players
Slovak Super Liga players
Expatriate footballers in Slovakia
Czech expatriate sportspeople in Slovakia
Sportspeople from the Zlín Region